The men's qualification for association football tournament at the 1956 Summer Olympics was the first time the qualifying round was done on a home-and-away basis.

Qualifications
The final tournament had 16 spots reserved with 28 countries initially showing interest in the tournament.

 Europe: 4 places, contested by 8 teams (including Israel).
 Africa: 1 place, contested by 2 teams.
 Asia: 6 places, contested by 12 teams.
 Americas: 1 place, contested by 2 teams.

Europe

|}
|}

|}

1 Romania withdrew.
2 As East and West Germany agreed to compete together at the 1956 Olympics, East Germany withdrew. However, after an agreement for a combined football team fell through, a solely West German one was fielded.

Africa

|}

Asia

|}

1 Both teams withdrew; the tie was scratched.
2 As the withdrawal of other teams left six winners, the tie was scratched and both teams qualified automatically.
3 Both matches were played in Japan due to the lack of a suitable stadium in South Korea; Japan advanced on the drawing of lots.
4 Philippines withdrew.
5 Republic of China withdrew after the organizing committee ruled they had to play under the FIFA flag during the first leg, due to concerns over social and political unrest in Indonesia relating to the use of the Blue Sky with a White Sun flag.

Americas

|}

1 Mexico withdrew.

Notes on qualifying

After the draw, Hungary also withdrew: its place was offered to South Korea, however South Korea declined due to financial reasons.

Subsequently, South Vietnam and Turkey both withdrew, while
The People's Republic of China and Egypt boycotted the Olympics.

Qualifying Matches

Both Bulgaria and Great Britain advanced.

Soviet Union advanced.

Japan advanced by the drawing of lots.

See also
 Australian football at the 1956 Summer Olympics
 1956 Summer Olympics

Further reading
 Guinness Record of World Soccer, by Guy Oliver (1st ed., Guinness Publishing, 1992)
 The Times newspaper, various dates

References

External links
 Russell Gerrard. Games of the XVI Olympiad. Football Qualifying Tournament. RSSSF. 20 September 1998.

Football qualification for the 1956 Summer Olympics